A bra (common form of brassiere) is a woman's undergarment designed to support the breasts.

Bra may also refer to:

 Bra cheese, a style of cheese from the Italian comune Bra
 Bra sausage, a style of sausage from the Italian comune Bra
 Bra–ket notation, a standard notation for describing quantum states, composed of angle brackets and vertical bars
 Front-end bra, a cover over the front part of a vehicle
 Male bra or compression bra, a brassiere for men
 Bra (Dragon Ball), a character in the Dragon Ball manga

Places
 Bra, Piedmont, a comune in the Province of Cuneo, Piedmont, Italy
 Piazza Bra, a piazza in Verona, Veneto, Italy
 Bra, Wallonia, a former municipality in the province of Liège, now district of Lierneux, Belgium

See also
 BRA (disambiguation)